Jonathan Patrick "Pat" McCarty (born January 24, 1982) is an American former professional racing cyclist.

McCarty grew up in Allen, Texas, a suburb of Dallas. When McCarty was 11, his brother went to college and left his bike.  Growing up in a cycling family, he started riding .

Major results

2002
 4th Overall Ronde de l'Isard
 6th Overall Le Triptyque des Monts et Châteaux
 7th La Côte Picarde
 9th Liège–Bastogne–Liège U23
2003
 1st Overall Ronde de l'Isard
1st Stage 3
 3rd La Transalsace
 3rd Tour de Saône-et-Loire
 7th Liège–Bastogne–Liège U23
2004
 Tour de Nez
2nd Road race
2nd Criterium
5th Time trial
2007
 2nd U.S. Open Cycling Championships
2008
 1st Stage 1 (TTT) Giro d'Italia
 1st  Mountains classification, Vuelta a Chihuahua
 3rd Univest Grand Prix
2009
 8th Overall Univest Grand Prix
2010
 6th Overall Tour of Utah
2011
 1st  Mountains classification, Tour of California
 8th Overall Tour of Utah
 9th Overall Tour de Beauce
2013
 1st  Mountains classification, Tour de Beauce

References

External links

American male cyclists
1982 births
Living people
People from Allen, Texas